Codonium is a genus of hydrozoans belonging to the family Corynidae.

The species of this genus are found in Western Europe.

Species:

Codonium codonophorum 
Codonium conicum 
Codonium proliferum

References

Corynidae
Hydrozoan genera